The Ashram Road is one of the major roads in the city of Ahmedabad in India. A major portion of the road runs parallel to the Sabarmati. The road is a major financial hub of the city with the offices of the Reserve Bank of India and the Income Tax department located on the road. The road is also a tourist destination with the Sabarmati Ashram and the City Gold multiplex located on the road. Several of the best showrooms for sarees and traditional clothing like Asopalav and Anupam are situated on this road.

Important offices and landmarks located on Ashram road are:

 Reserve Bank of India Office
 Income Tax Office Buildings
 Times of India Office Building
 Sabarmati Ashram
 Gujarat Vidyapith
 Gujarat Chamber of Commerce and Industry
M. J. Library
Town Hall
 Ahmedabad Collectorate
 All India Radio
 Road Transport Office (RTO)
 Vadilal Sarabhai Hospital
 ATMA House

Transport in Ahmedabad
Central business districts in India